Marcel Kpamin Kouégbé Métoua (born 15 November 1988) is an Ivorian professional footballer who plays as a defender. He has played for Ivorian side ASC Ouragahio, Serbian FK Banat Zrenjanin and last, and most extensively, played for FC Sheriff Tiraspol in the Moldovan National Division.

Career
Born in Attecoubé, he started his career in 2006, playing with the Ivorian club ASC Ouragahio. In January 2008, he moved to Serbia to play with a lower league club, FK Fruškogorac. After 6 months, he signed with Serbian SuperLiga club FK Banat Zrenjanin, where he played until the summer of 2011. He played in the 2009-10 and 
the 2010–11 season in the Serbian First League. After the first season with Banat, the club was relegated. In the summer of 2011, FC Sheriff Tiraspol made the best offer and signed him.

On 22 December 2016, Sheriff Tiraspol announced that they had decided not to extend Métoua's contract, and that he would become a free agent after five years with the club.

Career statistics

Honours
Sheriff
Moldovan National Division (4): 2011–12, 2012–13, 2013–14, 2015–16
Moldovan Cup (1): 2014–15
Moldovan Super Cup (4): 2013, 2014, 2015, 2016

References

External sources 
 Profile and stats at Srbijafudbal.

Living people
1988 births
Ivorian footballers
Ivorian expatriate footballers
FK Banat Zrenjanin players
Serbian First League players
Serbian SuperLiga players
FC Sheriff Tiraspol players
Moldovan Super Liga players
Association football defenders
Footballers from Abidjan
Expatriate footballers in Serbia
Expatriate footballers in Moldova
Ivorian expatriate sportspeople in Serbia
Ivorian expatriate sportspeople in Moldova